The Institut Pierre Simon Laplace (Pierre Simon Laplace Institute) is a French organization made up of 9 laboratories (CEREA, GEOPS, LATMOS, a team from LERMA, LISA, LMD, LOCEAN, LPMAA, LSCE and METIS) that conducts research into climate science.

References

External pages 

Official website

Scientific organizations based in France
Climate change organizations